Anders Järryd was the defending champion but lost in the first round to Bud Schultz.

Ivan Lendl won in the final 6–4, 6–4, 7–6 against Henri Leconte.

Seeds

  Ivan Lendl (champion)
  Anders Järryd (first round)
  Andrés Gómez (quarterfinals)
  Paul Annacone (semifinals)
  Henri Leconte (final)
  Ben Testerman (quarterfinals)
  John Sadri (first round)
  John Fitzgerald (semifinals)

Draw

Finals

Section 1

Section 2

External links
 1985 Custom Credit Australian Indoor Championships draw

Singles